Ethan Spaulding is an American animation director, producer and storyboard artist, well known as a crew person on the animated television series Avatar: The Last Airbender. He directed twelve episodes, and held various crew positions on several others. After Avatar concluded, he moved to Warner Bros. Animation, where he served as a producer of the 2011 ThunderCats reboot. He also served as a storyboard artist for The Legend of Korra, and co-directed the 2014 animated film Batman: Assault on Arkham.

Credits

Avatar: The Last Airbender

As director
 "Return to Omashu"
 "The Blind Bandit"
 "Bitter Work"
 "The Serpent's Pass"
 "The Tales of Ba Sing Se"
 "The Earth King" 
 "The Painted Lady"
 "The Avatar and the Firelord"
 "Nightmares and Daydreams"
 "The Western Air Temple"
 "The Boiling Rock (Part 2)"
 "Sozin's Comet (Part 1: The Phoenix King)"

As storyboard artist
 "The Southern Air Temple"
 "The Storm"
 "The Deserter"
 "The Siege of the North (Part I)"
 "Return to Omashu"
 "The Blind Bandit"
 "Bitter Work"
 "The Serpent's Pass"
 "The Tales of Ba Sing Se"

As assistant director
 "The Southern Air Temple"
 "The Storm"

Other credits
 Scooby-Doo! Camp Scare
 Scooby-Doo! Legend of the Phantosaur
 Justice League: The Flashpoint Paradox (storyboard artist)
 Son of Batman 
 Batman: Assault on Arkham (co-directed with Jay Oliva)
 Justice League: Throne of Atlantis (director)
 Mike Tyson Mysteries (directed 17 episodes)
 Lego Scooby-Doo! Blowout Beach Bash
 Lego DC Comics Super Heroes: The Flash
 Scooby-Doo! Return to Zombie Island (co-directed with Cecilia Aranovich Hamilton)
Mortal Kombat Legends: Scorpion's Revenge
Mortal Kombat Legends: Battle of the Realms
 Catwoman: Hunted (producer with Colin A.B.V. Lewis)

References

Living people
Year of birth missing (living people)
American television directors
Place of birth missing (living people)
American storyboard artists